Bridge is a sculpture by Stephen Shachtman, installed in Denver, Colorado, U.S.

References

Outdoor sculptures in Denver